Argyrophis oatesii, also known commonly as the Andaman Island worm snake or Oates's blind snake, is a species of harmless snake in the family Typhlopidae. The species is endemic to the Andaman Islands. There are no subspecies that are recognized as being valid.

Etymology
The specific name, oatesii, is in honor of English ornithologist Eugene William Oates.

Geographic range
Until recently, A. oatesii was only known from the type locality, which is "Table Island, Cocos Group, Andamans" in the Bay of Bengal. Table Island belongs to Myanmar. However, Murthy and Chakrapany (1983), reported finding a second specimen from the island of Mayabunder, just off the coast of Middle Andaman Island, which belongs to India.

Description
Boulenger (1893) described A. oatesii as follows: 
"24 scales round the body. Yellowish, with confluent brown spots corresponding to the series of scales and forming longitudinal lines which are broader than the interspaces. Total length [including tail] 200 millim. [7.9 inches]."

Reproduction
Argyrophis oatesii is oviparous.

References

Further reading

Boulenger GA (1890). The Fauna of British India, Including Ceylon and Burma. Reptilia and Batrachia. London: Secretary of State for India in Council. (Taylor and Francis, printers). xviii + 541 pp. (Typhlops oatesii, new species, p. 238).
Boulenger GA (1893). Catalogue of the Snakes in the British Museum (Natural History). Volume I., Containing the Families Typhlopidæ ... London: Trustees of the British Museum (Natural History). (Taylor and Francis, printers). xiii + 448 pp. + Plates I–XXVIII. (Typhlops oatesii, pp. 23–24 + Plate II, figures 3a, 3b, 3c).
Hedges SB, Marion AB, Lipp KM, Marin J, Vidal N (2014). "A taxonomic framework for typhlopid snakes from the Caribbean and other regions (Reptilia, Squamata)". Caribbean Herpetology (49): 1–61. (Asiatyphlops oatesii, new combination).
Murthy TSN, Chakrapany S (1983). "Rediscovery of the blind snake Typhlops oatesii in Andamans, India". The Snake 15 (1): 48–49, 2 figures.
Pyron RA, Wallach V (2014). "Systematics of the blindsnakes (Serpentes: Scolecophidea: Typhlopoidea) based on molecular and morphological evidence". Zootaxa 3829 (1): 001–081. (Argyrophis oatesii, new combination).
Smith MA (1943). The Fauna of British India, Ceylon and Burma, Including the Whole of the Indo-Chinese Sub-region. Reptilia and Amphibia. Vol. III.—Serpentes. London: Secretary of State for India. (Taylor and Francis, printers). xii + 583 pp. (Typhlops oatesii, p. 53).

oatesii
Taxa named by George Albert Boulenger
Reptiles described in 1890